Ground meat, called mince or minced meat outside North America, is meat finely chopped by a meat grinder or a chopping knife. A common type of ground meat is ground beef, but many other types of meats are prepared in a similar fashion, including pork, veal, lamb, goat meat, and poultry.

Dishes
Ground meat is used in a wide variety of dishes, by itself, or mixed with other ingredients. It may be formed into meatballs which are then fried, baked, steamed, or braised. They may be cooked on a skewer to produce dishes such as adana kebabı and ćevapi. It may be formed into patties which are then grilled or fried (hamburger), breaded and fried (menchi-katsu, Pozharsky cutlet), or braised (Salisbury steak). It may be formed into meatloaves or pâtés and baked. It may also be used as a filling or stuffing for meat pies and böreks, and also as stuffing. It may be made into meat sauce such as ragù, which in turn is used in dishes like pastitsio and moussaka, or mixed with sauce and served on a bun as a sloppy joe sandwich. It may also be cooked with beans, tomatoes, and/or spices to make chili con carne.

Indian subcontinent

In the Indian subcontinent, minced meat is used in a variety of dishes such as a stewed or fried curry dish of minced beef, mutton (i.e., goat meat or chevon) or other kinds of meat with green peas or potatoes. It usually includes ghee/butter, onions, garlic, ginger, chilis, and spices. Minced meat is called keema or qeema in the Indian subcontinent. Keema can be grilled on a skewer and is then called seekh kebab, or it is used as a filling for samosas or naan.

The word ultimately comes from the Turkic word qıyma meaning 'minced meat', and is thus related to the Persian qeyme, Turkish kıyma, and Greek kimás.

Food safety
Ground meat has food safety concerns very different from whole cuts of meat. If undercooked, it can lead to food poisoning. In a whole cut from an animal, the interior of the meat is essentially sterile, even before cooking; any bacterial contamination is on the outer surface of the meat. This is why, for example, it is typically safe for humans to consume steak that is cooked "rare" in such a way that the interior of the cut remains red in colour - the searing of the exterior of the meat is enough to kill any bacteria on the surface. However, when meat is ground, bacterial contamination from the surface can be distributed throughout the meat. If ground beef is not well cooked all the way through, there is a significant chance that enough pathogenic bacteria will survive to cause illness. Moreover, the warming will speed the reproduction of bacteria. Undercooked Jack in the Box hamburgers contaminated in this manner were responsible for four deaths and the illness of hundreds of people in 1993.

To ensure the safety of ground meat distributed through the National School Lunch Program, food banks, federal food and nutrition programs, the United States Department of Agriculture has established food safety and quality requirements for the ground beef that it purchases. A 2010 United States National Research Council report reviewed the scientific basis of the Department's ground beef safety standards, evaluated how the standards compare to those used by large retail and commercial food service purchasers of ground beef, and looked at ways to establish periodic evaluations of the Federal Purchase Ground Beef Program. The report found that although the safety requirements could be strengthened using scientific concepts, the prevention of future outbreaks of food-borne disease will depend on eliminating contamination during production and ensuring meat is properly cooked before it is served.

See also

 Forcemeat
 Mincemeat
 Pink slime

References

 
Meat industry